Paul Lloyd may refer to:

 Paul Lloyd (boxer) (born 1968), English boxer
 Paul Lloyd (footballer) (born 1987), English football midfielder
 P. J. Black (Phillip Paul Lloyd, born 1981), South African professional wrestler

See also
 Paul B. Loyd Jr., American businessman